Extreme Close-Up is a 1973 film directed by Jeannot Szwarc and written by Michael Crichton. It deals with privacy in an ever growing technological age.

It was also known as Sex Through a Window.

Plot
A television reporter rents surveillance equipment for a story on the intrusion of surreptitious surveillance in peoples' private lives. He spies on his neighbors and eventually a broader range of citizens, finding himself caught up in the dark world of voyeurism.

Cast
 Jim McMullan as John Norman 
 Katherine Woodville as Sally Norman 
 James A. Watson Jr. as Cameraman 
 Bara Byrnes as Sylvia Marina 
 Al Checco as Surveillance Salesman 
 Jacqueline Giroux as Barbie 
 Curtis Credel as Reporter

Production
Producer Paul Lazarus III says the film was inspired in part by the success of I Am Curious (Yellow). He approached Michael Crichton with whom he made Westworld (1973) and suggested they make a film which got some nudity on screen "without creating some kind of uproar that ruins people." They came up with the story and Crichton wrote the script. "This was an era of grainy 8mm stag films," said Lazarus III, "Our thinking was we could put what nudity we wanted... into a kind of action thriller format."
 
Lazarus sold the film to a financier, Ted Mann, on the basis of Crichton's reputation. He offered to make the whole movie for $209,000.

Director Jeannot Szwarc was hired in part because he was French "and we thought he'd known how to do this," according to Lazarus III.

Ted Mann arranged a distribution deal with National General, who changed the title to Sex Through a Window. The film failed commercially and Crichton took it off his filmography.

According to Crichton, he "became interested in the idea of making an X-rated film that would also be a good movie. What happened to it was that it got shot as a soft R, and that just destroyed it. I mean it really had a hard edge that I thought was interesting, and it was a good script, but it had to be an X. The minute it was not an X, it was just all over. I wasn't involved in the production... it was a low budget picture that didn't turn out as I hoped."

See also
 List of American films of 1973

References

External links

Review of film at The New York Times
Review of film at Temple of Schlock

1973 films
Films directed by Jeannot Szwarc
1973 drama films
American drama films
Films with screenplays by Michael Crichton
Films scored by Basil Poledouris
1973 directorial debut films
1970s English-language films
1970s American films